Chase Tower, located in the Chicago Loop area of Chicago, in the U.S. state of Illinois at 10 South Dearborn Street, is a 60-story skyscraper completed in 1969.  At 850 feet (259 m) tall, it is the eleventh-tallest building in Chicago and the tallest building inside the Chicago 'L' Loop elevated tracks, and, as of May 2022, the 66th-tallest in the United States. JPMorgan Chase has its U.S. and Canada commercial and retail banking headquarters here. The building is also the headquarters of Exelon.
The building and its plaza (known as Exelon Plaza) occupy the entire block bounded by Clark, Dearborn, Madison, and Monroe streets.

History

Before the building was constructed, the Morrison Hotel, on its former site, was demolished in 1965. The building first opened in 1969 as First National Plaza. When constructed, it was the headquarters of First Chicago Corporation. In 1998, it became the headquarters for Bank One Corporation, and accordingly it was renamed Bank One Tower,  The current name dates from  October 24, 2005, one year after Bank One merged with Chase. Chase's retail bank division is based in the tower.

For a time the National Public Radio show Wait Wait... Don't Tell Me! was taped on Thursday nights before a live audience at the Chase Auditorium under the plaza. In 2022 the show permanently moved to the Fine Arts Building.

Design and features
Design architects for the construction were C.F. Murphy Associates, Stanislaw Z. Gladych and Perkins and Will. Chase Tower is known for both its distinctive curving shape and its vibrant public space: a deep sunken plaza at the geographic center of the Chicago Loop, complete with a jet fountain and Marc Chagall's ceramic wall mural Four Seasons.

The ground floor is home to the largest Chase Bank branch in Chicago with 22 ATMs.

See also

 List of tallest buildings in the United States
 List of tallest buildings in Chicago
 World's tallest structures
 List of tallest buildings in the world

Position in Chicago's skyline

References

External links

 projectchicago.org entry: Chase Tower
 Emporis listing
 Chase press release when the company changed the tower's name in 2005
 skyscraper.org

Office buildings completed in 1969
Skyscraper office buildings in Chicago
JPMorgan Chase buildings
1969 establishments in Illinois